Bulbophyllum crassipes (thick-spurred bulbophyllum) is a species of orchid.

crassipes
Taxa named by Joseph Dalton Hooker